Dubreuil may refer to:

 Alphonse du Congé Dubreuil (1734–1801), French playwright and poet
 Geoffroy du Breuil of Vigeois, 12th-century French chronicler
 Jacques Lemaigre-Dubreuil (1894–1955), French businessman and activist
 Louis Étienne Arthur Dubreuil, vicomte de La Guéronnière (1816–1875), French politician and aristocrat
 Marie-France Dubreuil (born 1974), Canadian figure skater
 Toussaint Dubreuil (c. 1561–1602), French painter
 Victor Dubreuil (1846–after 1910), Franco-American painter of currency still lives. 

Surnames of French origin